Agnieszka Domańska (born 8 March 1975 in Łódź) is a Polish former ice dancer. She and partner Marcin Głowacki trained in Łódź, coached by Maria Olszewska-Lelonkiewicz.

Domańska / Głowacki placed 12th at the World Junior Figure Skating Championships in 1991, 20th and 21st at the World Figure Skating Championships in 1992 and 1993, respectively, and 19th, 14th, 15th at the European Figure Skating Championships in 1992, 1993 and 1994, respectively. They also skated at the 1994 Olympic Games, where they placed 17th.

Earlier in her career, Domańska was a Polish national junior champion with Sebastian Kolasiński.

Results
(ice dance with Marcin Głowacki)

References

External links 
 
 
 
 

Polish female ice dancers
Figure skaters at the 1994 Winter Olympics
Olympic figure skaters of Poland
Living people
Sportspeople from Łódź
1975 births